Weinmannioscyphus is a genus of fungi in the family Helotiaceae. This is a monotypic genus, containing the single species Weinmannioscyphus messerschmidii.

References

External links
Weinmannioscyphus at Index Fungorum

Helotiaceae
Monotypic Ascomycota genera